Army Men: World War - Final Front (titled Army Men: Lock 'n' Load in Europe) is a third-person shooter video game developed and published by The 3DO Company exclusively for PlayStation. It is the third installment in the World War subseries.

Overview
Army Men: World War - Final Front is a third-person shooter, with the gameplay style being very much like the previous Army Men. Once again, many of the missions are modeled after World War II battles and some battles take place in mysterious regions such as desert lands resembling Egypt and Jungles similar to South America's. It also features the player to control vehicles, such as bikes, tanks, boats and submarines.

Reception

The game received "mixed" reviews according to the review aggregation website Metacritic. Scott Steinberg of NextGen compared the game to the Vietnam War, calling it "a downright ugly and vicious war you just can't win."

References

External links

2001 video games
Army Men
Multiplayer and single-player video games
PlayStation (console) games
PlayStation (console)-only games
Third-person shooters
Video games developed in the United States